Arthur David Kean (1882–1961), often known as "Cowboy" Kean, was a Canadian filmmaker, journalist, broadcaster, photographer, and horseman. He was the first British Columbia resident to earn his living as a filmmaker, and the first to produce a feature film, the ill-fated Policing the Plains (1927).

Early life (1882–1913) 
Born in Emerson, Manitoba, Kean spent most of his first thirty years in the western United States and the interior of British Columbia. In 1897, his family relocated from Houston, Texas, to BC. In the province's East Kootenay region and Boundary Country, and in north-eastern Washington state, Arthur worked as a farmer, cowboy, teamster, butcher, horseman and rodeo competitor. He competed in the Calgary Stampede (1912) and the Winnipeg Stampede (1913)—as well as the "Real West" event at Minoru Park in Richmond, BC (1913), where he took first place in the wild horse race on opening day. His first magazine articles appeared in Rod and Gun in Canada in 1913.

Film career (1914–1927) 
One of the first Canadians to make a living as a cinematographer, he went into business in Vancouver in 1914 under the name "Kean's Canada Films." He documented local events and industries, but became best known for his films of BC regiments departing for overseas during the Great War. He also organized and managed (and filmed) several local rodeos or stampedes, including the "Range Days" events at the 1914, 1915 and 1923 Vancouver Exhibition. From 1920 to 1922, Kean was the main cinematographer for the British Columbia Patriotic and Educational Picture Service (PEPS), one of the first government film agencies in Canada. When the service collapsed amid political scandal, he tried feature film production.

Policing the Plains, which he wrote, produced, directed and photographed, was a historical docudrama about the Royal Northwest Mounted Police. Filmed mainly in British Columbia and Alberta during the years 1924–1927, the production was plagued by financial and logistical problems. It finally premiered to mixed reviews in December 1927. However, Kean was unable to secure further distribution or exhibition, and it was never screened publicly again. Kean left the film industry and settled in the Toronto area; his picture was eventually lost or destroyed. Throughout his film career, he faced great difficulty in getting his work shown or distributed, due in large part to the American movie industry's control of Canadian film exchanges and theatre chains.

BC archivist and historian David Mattison assessed Kean's legacy in a 1986 article:Kean was an extraordinary individual who single-handedly attempted to establish a new industry. Two reasons for his failure are familiar to filmmakers today: lack of provincial and federal incentives to filmmakers and their financial backers, and apathy on the part of Canadians for their own history and heroes. As Kean discovered, Made-In-The-USA is still a more powerful influence than Made-In-Canada.

Toronto and vicinity (1928–1961) 
In Toronto, Kean enjoyed a third career (1928–1940 and 1948) as a writer and radio personality, turning episodes from his youth into lively adventure stories in the Toronto Star Weekly and on popular radio programs. His radio shows included series of broadcast talks like Rainbow Ranch (CFRB Toronto, 1936) and the drama series Sails and Saddles (CBL Toronto to CBC network, 1938), which he wrote, narrated and acted in. During the Second World War, Kean worked at various tool-and-die plants in the Toronto area. He also enjoyed some local renown as a trainer and photographer of horses.

Selected filmography 
Kean's 1914-1927 film productions were shot on 35 mm black & white nitrate film stock; most of them have not survived. Titles of the extant films listed below are linked to their archival descriptions.

The BC Animated Review (1914). Newsreel compilation showing Vancouver events. Lost.
BC for the Empire (1916). Compilation of documentary shorts showing BC military units departing for service in the First World War. Lost.
The North British-Columbians, "Warden's Warriors," 102'nd Batt. C.E.F., Historic Departure (1916) The unit is shown on parade at Comox, BC, and departing for Vancouver. Extant.
Whaling: British Columbia's Least Known and Most Romantic Industry (1916–19). Documentary filmed on the BC coast. Extant; viewable online via Library and Archives Canada's YouTube page.
Told in the Hills (1917). Docudrama filmed at rodeos in Princeton and Penticton, BC. Lost.
The Adventures of Count E. Z. Kisser (1917). Comedy short filmed in Vancouver. Lost.
Profits from Oysters, aka Oyster Cultivation in British Columbia (1920). PEPS short about the oyster industry, highlighting its employment of Asian labourers; used as political propaganda in the 1920 BC provincial election. Lost.
Fiftieth Anniversary of Fort Macleod, Alberta (1924). Short film recording the anniversary celebrations, parade, and rodeo. Extant; viewable online.
Policing the Plains (1927). Feature film about the history of the Royal Northwest Mounted Police, based on the book of the same name by Rev. R. G. MacBeth. Filmed in BC, Alberta, Saskatchewan and Ontario, April 1924-September 1927. Lost.
Fox Hunting in Canada (1949). A 16 mm short showing the activities of the Toronto-North York Hunt. Extant.

References

External links

1882 births
1961 deaths
Canadian documentary film directors
Canadian radio personalities
Cinema of British Columbia
Film directors from Manitoba
People from Emerson, Manitoba
Canadian documentary film producers
Film producers from Manitoba